The Cliche River (in French: rivière Cliche) is a tributary of the west bank of the Chaudière River which flows northwards to empty onto the south bank of the St. Lawrence River. It flows in the municipalities of Saint-Frédéric (MRC Robert-Cliche Regional County Municipality) and Saint-Joseph-des-Érables, in the La Nouvelle-Beauce Regional County Municipality, in the administrative region of Chaudière-Appalaches, in Quebec, in Canada.

Geography 

The main neighboring watersheds of the Cliche river are:
 north side: Lessard River, Nadeau River, Savoie River, Chaudière River;
 east side: Chaudière River;
 south side: Castors stream, Ormes stream, rivière des Fermes, Cinque River;
 west side: Lessard River.

The Cliche river takes its source on the eastern slope of a mountain located in the northwestern part of the municipality of Saint-Frédéric.

From its source, the Cliche river flows over  divided into the following segments:
  southeasterly, in the municipality of Saint-Frédéric, to rang Saint-Narcisse road;
  southeasterly, to rang Saint-Pierre road;
  northeasterly, to route 112;
  northeasterly, to the limit of the municipality of Saint-Joseph-des-Érables, Quebec|Saint-Joseph-des-Érables;
  eastward, up to its confluence.

The Cliche river empties on the west bank of the Chaudière River, in Saint-Joseph-des-Érables.

Toponymy 
The toponym Rivière Cliche was formalized on August 28, 1980, at the Commission de toponymie du Québec.

See also 

 List of rivers of Quebec

References 

Rivers of Chaudière-Appalaches